Santi Suk is a tambon (subdistrict) of Doi Lo District, in Chiang Mai Province, Thailand. In 2015 it had a population of 3,852 people.

History
The subdistrict was created effective 1 May 1991 by splitting off eight administrative villages from Yang Khram.

Administration

Central administration
The tambon is divided into nine administrative villages (mubans).

Local administration
The subdistrict is covered by the subdistrict municipality (thesaban tambon) Santi Suk (เทศบาลตำบลสันติสุข).

References

External links
Thaitambon.com on Santi Suk

Tambon of Chiang Mai province
Populated places in Chiang Mai province